Axis of Evol is the second album by Pink Mountaintops,  released by Jagjaguwar in 2006. It was recorded in July 2005 at the Argyle Hotel and the Jackson Five House.

Reception
Axis of Evol received positive reviews from critics. On Metacritic, the album holds a score of 75 out of 100 based on 14 reviews, indicating "generally favorable reviews."

Track listing
All songs written by Stephen McBean.
 "Comas" - 2:53
 "Cold Criminals" – 4:39
 "New Drug Queens" – 1:47
 "Slaves" – 8:52
 "Plastic Man, You're the Devil" – 3:52
 "Lord, Let Us Shine" – 5:05
 "How We Can Get Free" – 5:05

References

2006 albums
Pink Mountaintops albums
Jagjaguwar albums